Louis Joseph Dalton (20 September 1862 – 13 January 1945) was an Irish Cumann na nGaedheal politician. He was first elected to Dáil Éireann as a Cumann na nGaedheal Teachta Dála (TD) for the Tipperary constituency at the 1923 general election. He did not contest the June 1927 general election.

References

1862 births
1945 deaths
Cumann na nGaedheal TDs
Members of the 4th Dáil
Politicians from County Tipperary